Mungmung is an annual festival of the Sangtam Nagas held in September in the state of Nagaland, India.

See also 
 List of traditional Naga festivals

References 

Festivals in Nagaland